In descriptive set theory, a tree over a product set  is said to be homogeneous if there is a system of measures  such that the following conditions hold:
 The measures are in some sense compatible under restriction of sequences: if , then .

An equivalent definition is produced when the final condition is replaced with the following:
This condition can be thought of as a sort of countable completeness condition on the system of measures.

 is said to be -homogeneous if each  is -complete.

Homogeneous trees are involved in Martin and Steel's proof of projective determinacy.

References
 

Descriptive set theory
Determinacy